Maccagno railway station is a railway station in the comune of Maccagno con Pino e Veddasca, in the Italian region of Lombardy. It is an intermediate stop on the standard gauge Cadenazzo–Luino line of Rete Ferroviaria Italiana.

Services 
 the following services stop at Maccagno:

References

External links 
 
 

Buildings and structures in the Province of Varese
Railway stations in Lombardy